Patricia 'Trish' Ann Steyn (born 1952) is a South African international lawn bowler.

Bowls career
Steyn won the gold medal in the women's fours at the 1998 Commonwealth Games in Kuala Lumpur, the team consisted of Loraine Victor, Hester Bekker and Lorna Trigwell.

The following year in 1999, she won the fours gold medal at the Atlantic Bowls Championships with Ellen Cawker, Bekker and Lorna Trigwell.

Five years later she won another gold with Jill Hackland and Loraine Victor in the Women's triples at the 2004 World Outdoor Bowls Championship in Leamington Spa.

References

Living people
1952 births
South African female bowls players
Bowls World Champions
Commonwealth Games medallists in lawn bowls
Commonwealth Games gold medallists for South Africa
Bowls players at the 1998 Commonwealth Games
Medallists at the 1998 Commonwealth Games